Anne-Julie Beaulieu (born September 26, 1994) is a Canadian badminton player who competes in international level events.

References

1994 births
Living people
Sportspeople from Quebec City
French Quebecers
Canadian female badminton players
Laval Rouge et Or athletes